Accordion band may refer to:

Any band that uses an accordion prominently, or is made up entirely of accordions
A Dominican jing ping band